HMS Cornwall   was one of 10  armoured cruisers built for the Royal Navy in the first decade of the 20th century. She was assigned to the 2nd Cruiser Squadron of the Channel Fleet on completion in 1903. The ship was refitted in 1907 in preparation for service as a training ship for cadets with the 4th Cruiser Squadron on the North America and West Indies Station beginning in 1908.

In 1909 she toured the Mediterranean and the Baltic, where she entertained the Kaiser who visited on his yacht the Hohenzollern at Kiel on 24 June.

Cornwall ran aground in 1911 while trying to free another cruiser, but was successfully refloated and repaired.

She captured a German merchant ship days after the beginning of World War I in August 1914 and was then sent to the Central Atlantic to search for German commerce raiders. Later that year, the ship was assigned to the squadron that destroyed the German East Asia Squadron at the Battle of the Falklands, where she helped to sink a German light cruiser. Cornwall briefly blockaded a German cruiser in East Africa in early 1915 before she was sent to participate in the Dardanelles Campaign a month later. The ship was then transferred to the China Station late in the year and remained there until the end of 1916. She was then transferred to the North America Station that year for convoy escort duties and remained on that duty for the rest of the war. Cornwall became a training ship in 1919 before she was paid off later that year. The ship was sold for scrap in 1920.

Design and description

The ships were designed to displace . They were powered by two 4-cylinder triple-expansion steam engines, each driving one shaft using steam provided by 31 Belleville boilers.

The Monmouth-class ships' main armament consisted of fourteen breech-loading (BL)  Mk VII guns. Four of these guns were mounted in two twin-gun turrets, one each fore and aft of the superstructure, and the others were positioned in casemates amidships. Six of these were mounted on the main deck and were only usable in calm weather. Ten quick-firing (QF) 12-pounder 12-cwt guns were fitted for defence against torpedo boats. Cornwall also carried three 3-pounder  Hotchkiss guns and two submerged 18-inch (450 mm) torpedo tubes.

Beginning in 1915, the main deck six-inch guns of the Monmouth-class ships were moved to the upper deck and given gun shields. Their casemates were plated over to improve seakeeping. The twelve-pounder guns displaced by the transfer were repositioned elsewhere. At some point in the war, a pair of three-pounder anti-aircraft guns were installed on the upper deck. 
 
The armour of the gun turrets, their barbettes and the casemates was four inches thick.

Construction and service
Cornwall, named to commemorate the English county, was laid down at Pembroke Royal Dockyard, Wales, on 11 March 1901, and launched on 29 October 1902, when she was christened by the Countess of St Germans (nominated for this by the local Lord-Lieutenant).  She was completed on 1 December 1904 and was initially assigned to the 2nd Cruiser Squadron of the Channel Fleet. In December 1906 the ship began a refit that lasted through 1907. She became a cadet training ship in January 1908 and was assigned to the 4th Cruiser Squadron on the North America and West Indies Station. On 6 August 1911 Cornwall ran aground on Pinnacle Rock, off Cape Sable Island in Nova Scotia while assisting the protected cruiser , which had also run aground. Both cruisers were refloated and Cornwall was repaired at His Majesty's Canadian Dockyard, Halifax.

In December 1913, the ship was refitting in Devonport and resumed her training duties after it was completed in January 1914. Over the next six months, she visited ports ranging from Malta to São Vicente, Cape Verde to Trondheim, Norway. Cornwall participated in the July 1914 Fleet review at Spithead and was give a short refit at the end of the month. Upon its completion, she was assigned to the 5th Cruiser Squadron which was tasked with trade protection between the Azores, the Canary Islands and Gibraltar. En route to the latter,  Cornwall captured the German collier  on 5 August and was transferred to patrol the Brazilian coast in September as part of the 4th Cruiser Squadron under Vice-Admiral Christopher Craddock. 

After the German raider Cap Trafalgar was sunk, RMS Carmania was badly damaged, having lost nine men, but was able to rendezvous with Cornwall. Carmania was barely afloat when it made contact with Cornwall on 15 October. Carmania was escorted to Permambuco in Brazil where the ship was repaired before being sent to Gibraltar for further repair. 

The ship was later assigned to a new squadron intended to patrol the River Plate area and did not join Craddock's ships as they searched for the German East Asia Squadron off the Chilean coast. After Craddock's squadron was destroyed in the Battle of Coronel on 1 November, Cornwall then proceeded to the Falkland Islands with the squadron commanded by Vice-Admiral Doveton Sturdee.

Battle of the Falklands

Upon arrival at Port Stanley on 7 December 1914, Sturdee gave permission for Cornwall to put out her fires to clean her boilers and repair one engine. He planned to recoal the entire squadron the following day from the two available colliers and to begin the search for the East Asia Squadron the day after. Vice-Admiral Maximilian von Spee, commander of the German squadron, had other plans and intended to destroy the radio station at Port Stanley on the morning of 8 December. The appearance of two German ships at 07:30 caught Sturdee's ships by surprise although they were driven off by  shells fired by the predreadnought battleship  when they came within range around 09:20. This gave time for Cornwall to reassemble her engine and raise steam, although she had not even started to recoal. The squadron cleared the harbour by 10:30 and Sturdee ordered, "general chase". His two battlecruisers were the fastest ships present and inexorably began to close on the German cruisers. They opened fire at 12:55 and began to straddle the light cruiser , the rear ship in the German formation. It was clear to Spee that his ships could not outrun the battlecruisers and that the only hope for any of his ships to survive was to scatter. So he turned his two armoured cruisers around to buy time by engaging the battlecruisers and ordered his three light cruisers to disperse at 13:20.

In accordance with Sturdee's plans, Cornwall, her sister ship, and the light cruiser  immediately set off in pursuit while the battlecruisers and the slow armoured cruiser  dealt with the German armoured cruisers. At 14:45 Glasgow, the fastest of the British cruisers, was close enough to Leipzig to open fire and the two ships exchanged salvos and scoring the occasional hit. An hour later, the Germans scattered in different directions; Cornwall and Glasgow pursued Leipzig while Kent went after . Cornwall closed on the German ship at full speed, trusting to her armour to keep out the  shells, while the unarmoured Glasgow manoeuvered at a distance. One last gun fired and Leipzig did not strike her colours so the British fired several additional salvos at 19:25. The German captain had mustered his surviving crewmen on deck preparatory to abandoning ship, but the ship's flag could not be reached because it was surrounded by flames, and the British shells wrought havoc on the assembled crew. Leipzig fired two green flares at 20:12 and the British ships closed to within  and lowered boats to rescue the Germans at 20:45. Their ship capsized at 21:32 but only a total of 18 men were rescued in the darkness. Leipzig had hit Cornwall 18 times, but she did not lose a single man. The British ship rescued one officer and three ratings from Leipzig. Cornwall spent much of the rest of the month searching for the German ships that had not yet been captured or destroyed before departing for home on 3 January 1915.

Subsequent service

She arrived at Devonport on 11 February 1915 and spent the next month and a half refitting there and in Avonmouth before departing for South Africa on 23 March. The ship arrived at Kibondo Island off the German East African coast on 27 April to blockade the light cruiser  in the Rufiji River. Several weeks later Cornwall was called north to reinforce the British forces involved in the Dardanelles Campaign on 10 May. By the end of the year, she was en route to the China Station. The ship arrived at Singapore on 17 February 1916 and began a lengthy refit that lasted until 6 May. She then patrolled the area of the Dutch East Indies until returning to Singapore for the next several months. Cornwall departed for French Indochina on 21 July and the Governor-General of French Indochina visited the ship on 26 July while she was docked at Saigon. After her return to Singapore, she was inspected by the Commander-in-Chief of the China Station, Vice-Admiral William Grant, on 21 August. Cornwall resumed patrolling in the East Indies shortly afterwards and continued until Grant hoisted his flag aboard the ship on 22 October as he and his staff was ferried to Hong Kong. Upon arrival five days later, Grant lowered his flag as he transferred ashore. The ship patrolled off the Chinese coast for most of November and returned to Singapore on 11 December. Cornwall departed the city on 20 December bound for South Africa.

A few days after arriving in Freetown, Sierra Leone, on 29 January, Cornwall dismounted four of her 12-pounder guns; two of the guns were transferred to troopships in her convoy. She led the convoy back to sea on 2 February, bound for Devonport where they arrived on 17 February. The ship then sailed to Liverpool to begin a lengthy refit and was paid off there on 7 March. She recommissioned on 4 August and spent the next two weeks preparing to go back to sea. Cornwall departed Liverpool on 17 August and escorted at least one troopship to Halifax, Nova Scotia, arriving there a week later. She was now assigned to the North Atlantic and West Indies Station and began escorting convoys between North America and Britain on 19 September. Cornwall continued in this role for the next year and escorted her last convoy when she arrived at the Royal Naval Dockyard on the island of Ireland in the Imperial fortress colony of Bermuda, the main base of the North America and West Indies Station, on 18 October 1918. She departed the island on 14 December and arrived at Devonport eight days later. The ship resumed her prewar role as a cadet training ship on 25 January 1919. Vice-Admiral Morgan Singer, Commander-in-Chief, America and West Indies, inspected the ship on 9 May while she was berthed in Bermuda. Cornwall returned to Devonport on 31 July and was paid off on 21 August. The ship was sold for scrap on 7 June 1920. In 1922, Mount Cornwall in the Canadian Rockies was named in tribute to the ship.

Notes

Footnotes

Bibliography

External links

Monmouth class on battleships-cruisers.co.uk

 

Monmouth-class cruisers
Ships built in Pembroke Dock
1902 ships
World War I cruisers of the United Kingdom